Foochowese can refer to:

 People or things of Fuzhou, Fujian Province, China
 Foochowese people, an people residing or originating in Fuzhou, China
 Foochowese (linguistics), the native language (used mainly by Western scholars) of Fuzhou and its surrounding counties
 Romanized Foochowese, a Latin alphabet for the Fuzhou dialect